David Ó Sétacháin (died 1290) was Bishop of Kilmacduagh.

David Ó Sétacháin was elected and received possession of the temporalities after 27 March 1284. He died before 13 June 1290.

References

Bibliography
 The Surnames of Ireland, Edward MacLysaght, 1978, 

People from County Galway
13th-century Roman Catholic bishops in Ireland
1290 deaths